Seth W. Brown (January 4, 1841 – February 24, 1923) was a U.S. Representative from Ohio.

He was born near Waynesville, Ohio and attended the public schools. During the Civil War, Brown served in Company H, Seventy-ninth Regiment, Ohio Volunteer Infantry. After the war, he engaged in the newspaper business, studied law, and was admitted to the bar in 1873, commencing practice in Waynesville, Ohio.

He served as prosecuting attorney for Warren County from 1880 to 1883. He resumed practicing law in Lebanon, Ohio, before serving as a member of the Ohio House of Representatives from 1883 to 1887. Brown was a presidential elector in 1888 for the Republican presidential and vice-presidential ticket of Harrison/Morton.

Brown was elected as a Republican to the Fifty-fifth and Fifty-sixth Congresses (March 4, 1897 to March 3, 1901). He unsuccessfully ran for renomination in 1900. After his retirement, Brown resumed his law practice in Lebanon and Cincinnati, Ohio. Until his death, Brown was a writer on political and governmental subjects.
Brown died in Lebanon, Ohio, February 24, 1923, and was interred in Miami Cemetery, Waynesville, Ohio.

References

Sources

1841 births
1923 deaths
Republican Party members of the United States House of Representatives from Ohio
People from Waynesville, Ohio
County district attorneys in Ohio
People of Ohio in the American Civil War
Ohio lawyers
Republican Party members of the Ohio House of Representatives
1888 United States presidential electors
19th-century American lawyers